Frederick I, Duke of Brunswick-Osterode (-1421) was a son of Duke Ernest I and his wife, Adelaide of Everstein-Polle.  In 1361, he succeeded his father as Count of Osterode.

He married Adelaide (d. before 1421), a daughter of Bernhard V, Prince of Anhalt-Bernburg, and was the father of Otto II (1396-1452), who succeeded him.

1350 births
Year of birth uncertain
1421 deaths
Dukes of Brunswick-Lüneburg
14th-century German nobility